Two Japanese warships have borne the name Kasasagi:

 , a  launched in 1899 and stricken in 1921
 , an  launched in 1935 and sunk in 1943

Imperial Japanese Navy ship names
Japanese Navy ship names